Boldewijn is a surname. Notable people with the surname include:

Enzio Boldewijn (born 1992), Dutch footballer
Geraldo Boldewijn (born 1991), American football player
Lucien Boldewijn (born 1971), Dutch basketball player

See also
Boudewijn (given name)

Dutch-language surnames